The 1971 Labour Party deputy leadership election took place in November 1971 after left-wingers Michael Foot and Tony Benn challenged sitting deputy leader Roy Jenkins.

Candidates
 Roy Jenkins, incumbent Deputy Leader, Member of Parliament for Birmingham Stechford
 Michael Foot, Shadow Leader of the House of Commons, Member of Parliament for Ebbw Vale
 Tony Benn, Chairman of the Labour Party, Member of Parliament for Bristol East

Results

As a result of the first round, Benn was eliminated.  The remaining two candidates were left to face each other in a second round a week later.

Sources
http://privatewww.essex.ac.uk/~tquinn/labour_party_deputy.htm 

1971
Labour Party deputy leadership
Tony Benn
Labour Party deputy leadership election